The 2003–04 Omani League was the 28th edition of the top football league in Oman. It began on 6 November 2003 and finished on 27 May 2004. Ruwi Club were the defending champions, having won the previous 2002–03 Omani League season. On Thursday, 27 May 2004, Al-Nasr S.C.S.C. won 2-1 at home in their final league match against Al-Oruba SC and emerged as the champions of the 2003–04 Omani League with a total of 46 points.

Teams
This season the league had decreased from 14 to 12 teams. Nizwa Club, Sidab Club, Al-Salam SC and Al-Ahli Club were relegated to the Second Division League after finishing in the relegation zone in the 2002–03 season. The four relegated teams were replaced by Second Division League teams Al-Tali'aa SC and Al-Nahda Club.

Stadia and locations

League table

Results

References

External links

Top level Omani football league seasons
1
Oman